Veľké Bierovce  is a village and municipality in Trenčín District in the Trenčín Region of northwestern Slovakia.

History
In historical records the village was first mentioned in 1332.

Geography
The municipality lies at an elevation of 202 metres and covers an area of 4.909 km². It has a population of about 604 people.

External links
https://web.archive.org/web/20080111223415/http://www.statistics.sk/mosmis/eng/run.html 

Villages and municipalities in Trenčín District